The Fair Work Amendment (Supporting Australia’s Jobs and Economic Recovery) Act 2021 (Cth) is an Act of the Parliament of Australia, which brought about considerable amendments to the Fair Work Act 2009. Prior to its passing, the legislation was considered to be the most significant industrial relations reform since the original Act's passage. It was also first reform of industrial relations passed by a Coalition government since the Workchoices legislation of the Howard Government.

The Act

Defining casual employment 
The Act's most significant reform was the defining of casual employment, confirming that casual employment will exist if:

 Employment was offered on the basis an employer made no firm advance commitment to continuing and indefinite work according to an agreed pattern of work,
 The employee accepts the offer of employment on that basis, and
 The employment is as a result of that acceptance.

Casual conversion 
The Act provides for landmark reform to casual conversion, requiring the offer of casual employment generally to be made to an employee working for 12 months or more with the last six months working a regular pattern of hours which could be worked as permanent.

References 

Acts of the Parliament of Australia